Peter Straughan (born 1968) is a British playwright, screenwriter and author, based in the north-east of England. He was writer-in-residence at Newcastle's Live Theatre Company. Whilst there, Live staged his plays, Bones and Noir. Both of these plays have displayed Straughan's talent for writing dark, twisted and witty stories.

Early life
His first ambition was to be a professional musician and he achieved this while playing bass guitar with Newcastle-based band "The Honest Johns". He spent four years touring and recording with the band through the late 1980s and into the early 1990s before leaving to take up full-time education at Newcastle University. While Peter was a student he was also a member of the band Cactusman. Peter wrote the song "Killer", which appeared on the CD album North of London, a collection of music by North East bands released through Newcastle Arts.

Screenwriting
Straughan co-wrote the 2006 feature film, Mrs Ratcliffe's Revolution and adapted Toby Young's memoir How to Lose Friends & Alienate People. He is the writer of the 2009 film, The Men Who Stare at Goats, and co-writer of the 2011 film Tinker Tailor Soldier Spy, for which he was nominated for the Academy Award for Adapted Screenplay, a screenplay he wrote in collaboration with his late wife Bridget O'Connor. O'Connor died of cancer, aged 49, in 2010, before the film was released. They were awarded a BAFTA for Best Adapted Screenplay.

He adapted Wolf Hall for television. Series 2 of Wolf Hall was confirmed to be in production on 27 May 2019.

Filmography

Film

Television

References

External links
 
 

21st-century British dramatists and playwrights
21st-century British screenwriters
21st-century British short story writers
21st-century English male writers
1968 births
Alumni of Newcastle University
Best Adapted Screenplay BAFTA Award winners
British male television writers
Date of birth missing (living people)
English dramatists and playwrights
English male dramatists and playwrights
English male screenwriters
English male short story writers
English screenwriters
English short story writers
English television directors
English television writers
Living people
Place of birth missing (living people)